Shadows is an album by saxophonist Gary Bartz, recorded in 1991 and released on the Dutch Timeless label.

Reception

Greg Turner of AllMusic wrote that "Bartz's strong tone, sense of swing, and improvisational imagination place him within the ranks of jazz's finest saxophonists, and he proves it throughout this recording... Shadows is an excellent addition to Bartz's extensive discography".

Track listing 
 "Marion's Theme" (John Williams) - 9:49
 "Shadows" (Gary Bartz) - 12:30
 "Song of the Underground Railroad" (John Coltrane) - 10:25
 "Peresina" (McCoy Tyner) - 14:35
 "How Do You Keep the Music Playing?" (Alan and Marilyn Bergman, Michel Legrand) - 4:50
 "Children of the Night" (Wayne Shorter) - 9:32
 "Holiday for Strings" (David Rose) - 7:41

Personnel 
Gary Bartz - alto saxophone, soprano saxophone
Willie Williams - tenor saxophone 
Benny Green - piano
Christian McBride - bass
Victor Lewis - drums

References 

Gary Bartz albums
1992 albums
Timeless Records albums